Tin Ha Wan Village is a village in the Hang Hau area of Sai Kung District, New Territories, Hong Kong.

Administration
Tin Ha Wan Village is a recognized village under the New Territories Small House Policy.

History
The current Tin Ha Wan Village is a resite village that was relocated together with the nearby Fat Tau Chau Village in the early 1990s. The historical location of Tin Ha Wan was in a bay near Fat Tong Chau. It comprised two settlements, Sheung Lau Wan and Ha Lau Wan, and had a population of 96 in 1955.

See also
 Fat Tau Chau, a nearby resite village

References

External links

 Delineation of area of existing village Tin Ha Wan (Hang Hau) for election of resident representative (2019 to 2022)
 Antiquities Advisory Board. Historic Building Appraisal. Tin Hau Temple, Hang Hau Pictures

 

Villages in Sai Kung District, Hong Kong
Hang Hau